The Raleigh class of amphibious transport docks served the United States Navy. They were designed under project SCB 187 (the La Salle with its command facilities was designed under SCB 187A).

Ships

References

Notes

Sources 
 

 
Amphibious warfare vessel classes